In New Jersey, a Board of County Commissioners (until 2020 named the Board of Chosen Freeholders) is the elected county-wide government board in each of the state's 21 counties. In the five counties that have an elected county executive, the board of county commissioners serves as the county legislature. In the remaining counties, the board of county commissioners exercises both executive and legislative functions, often with an appointed county administrator or manager overseeing the day-to-day operations of county government.

Origin 
New Jersey's former system of naming its county legislative bodies "boards of chosen freeholders" was unique in the United States. The origin of the name can be traced back to a law passed by the General Assembly of the Province of New Jersey on February 28, 1713/14, which stated:

That the Inhabitants of each Town and Precinct, within each County, shall assemble and meet together on the second Tuesday in March yearly and every Year, at the most publick Place of each respective Town and Precinct, and, by the Majority of Voices, choose two Freeholders for every such Town and Precinct for the ensuing Year ; which county commissioners so chosen, or the major Part of them, together with all the Justices of Peace of each respective County, or any three of them (one whereof being of the Quorum) shall meet together… [for the purpose of taking actions related to the construction and maintenance of county courthouses and jails].

The term "freeholder" as originally used in "Board of Chosen Freeholders" originally referred to individuals who owned land (as opposed to leasing it) in an amount set by law, and was derived from the term freehold.  "Chosen" means elected.

The New Jersey State Constitution of 1776, contained the following voter qualification provisions applicable to those voting in New Jersey elections, including county freeholder elections:
That all inhabitants of this Colony, of full age, who are worth fifty pounds proclamation money, clear estate in the same, and have resided within the county in which they claim a vote for twelve months immediately preceding the election, shall be entitled to vote for Representatives in Council and Assembly; and also for all other public officers, that shall be elected by the people of the county at large.

On March 3, 1786, a law was passed that incorporated the justices and chosen freeholders of each county as a body politic for the purpose of owning the county courthouse, jail and other public buildings. These bodies were styled as the "Board of Justices and chosen Freeholders" of each respective county.

A law that was passed on February 13, 1798, reincorporated the chosen freeholders into bodies that were named "The Board of Chosen Freeholders" of their respective counties. Under the new law, the functions previously performed by the justices and the chosen freeholders together were now performed by the freeholders alone. These included the authority to build and maintain jails, court houses and bridges. The Chosen freeholders were also now given the authority to build and operate poor houses.

Current use 

Current state law specifies that the boards may contain from three to nine seats. Due to the small sizes of the boards and the possibility of electing an exactly split legislature with the inevitably resulting deadlock, an odd-numbered board is required. The means of election of the county commissioner varies from all elected in districts to all elected at large to various systems in between. Elections are first past the post for single-member districts, and for at-large elections when only one seat is at stake. For at-large elections with more than one seat, plurality-at-large voting is used.

Depending on the county, the executive and legislative functions may be performed by the board or split. In some counties, members of the board of county commissioner perform both legislative and executive functions on a commission basis, with each county commissioner assigned responsibility for a department or group of departments. In other counties (Atlantic, Bergen, Essex, Hudson, and Mercer), there is a directly elected county executive who performs the executive functions while the board of county commissioner retains a legislative and oversight role. In counties without an executive, a county administrator (or county manager) may be hired to perform day-to-day administration of county functions. All of the above attributes may be changed by act of the board and a referendum, or by explicit change of the relevant laws by the New Jersey Legislature.

Controversy and name change 
The term "freeholder," which is used in no other state, has been criticized as a vestige of a time when only property owners could be elected, which led to white men controlling political power at a time when women and black people were unable to own property on their own.

In early July 2020, New Jersey Governor Phil Murphy reached an agreement with the Democratic leaders in both houses of the legislature under which the term "freeholder" would be eliminated and replaced with "county commissioner".

On July 14, 2020, Burlington County Freeholder Director Felicia Hopson called for "eliminating an antiquated title from an era when slavery and racism was tolerated" and announced plans for Burlington County to stop using the "freeholder" title on official communications and materials. The board planned to replace the title with "county commissioner" by passing a resolution at its August 20 meeting.

On August 21, 2020, "amid a national reckoning to reexamine vestiges of structural racism," Governor Murphy signed Senate Bill 855, which changed the name of county governing bodies and mandates updates to website, letterhead, stationary, and other writings. Lt. Governor Sheila Oliver, an African-American woman who was once a freeholder herself, said that the term "refers to a time when only white male landowners could hold public office."

The legislation took effect on January 1, 2021, and requires compliance within "one year of the bill’s effective date" or January 1, 2022.

Structure by county
All county commissioners are elected to three-year terms.

See also
 Board of selectmen, New England town government
 Board of supervisors
 Police Jury (Louisiana)
 County council
 County commission
 Sole commissioner
 County government
 Fiscal Court (Kentucky)
 Commissioners' court (Texas and Missouri; known in Arkansas as "Quorum Court")

References

County governing bodies in the United States
County government in New Jersey